Causonis is a genus of flowering plants belonging to the family Vitaceae; it is now placed in the tribe Cayratieae.

Its native range is Tropical and Subtropical Asia to Southwestern Pacific.

Species
Plants of the World Online currently includes:
 Causonis clematidea (F.Muell.) Jackes
 Causonis corniculata (Benth.) J.Wen & L.M.Lu
 Causonis eurynema (B.L.Burtt) Jackes
 Causonis japonica (Thunb.) Raf. - type species
 Causonis maritima (Jackes) Jackes
 Causonis pterita (Merr.) J.Wen & L.M.Lu
 Causonis trifolia (L.) Mabb. & J.Wen

References

Vitaceae
Vitaceae genera